The Droop quota is the quota most commonly used in elections held under the single transferable vote (STV) system. It is also sometimes used in elections held under the largest remainder method of party-list proportional representation (list PR). In an STV election the quota is the minimum number of votes a candidate must receive in order to be elected. Any votes a candidate receives above the quota are transferred to another candidate. The Droop quota was devised in 1868 by the English lawyer and mathematician Henry Richmond Droop (1831–1884) as a replacement for the earlier Hare quota.

Today the Droop quota is used in almost all STV elections, including the forms of STV used in India, the Republic of Ireland, Northern Ireland, Malta and Australia, among other places. It is also used to allocate seats via the largest remainder model in South Africa. The Droop quota is very similar to the simpler Hagenbach-Bischoff quota, which is also sometimes loosely referred to as the 'Droop quota'.

Formula
Sources differ as to the exact formula for the Droop quota. As used in the Republic of Ireland the formula is usually written:

but more precisely

or

where:

  = Total number of valid (unspoiled) votes cast in an election.
  = total number of seats to be filled in the election.
  refers to the floor or integer portion of the number, sometimes written as 

(The extra parentheses, while not strictly necessary from a mathematical standpoint, are often included in order to make the formula seem less ambiguous to non-mathematicians—if calculated out of sequence, an incorrect result would be arrived at, producing an incorrect quota.) It is important to use the Total Valid Poll, which is arrived at by subtracting the spoiled and invalid votes from the total poll.

The Droop quota is the smallest number that guarantees that no more candidates can reach the quota than the number of seats available to be filled. This gives the Droop quota the special property that it is the smallest integral quota which guarantees that the number of candidates able to reach this quota cannot exceed the number of seats. In a single winner election, in which STV becomes the same as instant-runoff voting, the Droop quota becomes a simple integral majority quota–that is, it will be equal to an absolute majority of votes. The formula follows from the requirement that the number of votes received by winning candidates (the Droop quota) must be greater than the remaining votes that might be received by an additional candidate or candidates (the Droop quota – 1):

In general the  can be written as

The Droop Quota can then be simplified:

since 

While in theory every STV election should see the right number of candidates elected through reaching the quota, in practice many voters may only vote for a small proportion of the candidates on the ballot paper, such as only those candidates from one party, or even only one candidate. Those votes are known as 'NTs', or 'non transferable votes', and the effect of their removal from the total valid poll may be to reduce the total number of votes available to such an extent that the last candidate left in a race may not actually have enough votes to reach the quota. Nevertheless, in reality, as no other candidate may mathematically be able to overtake them as the candidate nearest to the quota, they may in such circumstances be deemed elected "without reaching the quota". The quota is in fact constructed to ensure that it is mathematically impossible for candidates to achieve the quota beyond the number of available seats.

An example of use in STV
To see how the Droop quota works in an STV election imagine an election in which there are 2 seats to be filled and 3 candidates: Andrea, Carter and Brad. There are 102 voters. Two of these voters spoil their ballot papers. The remaining 100 voters vote as follows:

There are 102 voters but two spoil their papers so the Total Valid Poll is 100. There are 2 seats. Before rounding down the Droop quota is therefore:

Rounded down to the nearest integer the Droop quota is found to be 34. To begin the count the first preferences cast for each candidate are tallied and are as follows:
Andrea: 45
Carter: 25
Brad: 30

Andrea has more than 34 votes. She therefore has reached the quota and is declared elected. She has 11 votes more than the quota, and all her votes have Carter as second preference, so these votes are transferred to Carter. The tallies therefore become:
Carter: 36
Brad: 30

Carter now has reached the quota so is declared elected. The winners of the election are therefore Andrea and Carter.

Comparison with the Hare quota

The Droop quota is smaller than the Hare quota.  The Droop quota sometimes leaves nearly one Droop quota's worth of votes held by unsuccessful candidates; these ballots are effectively ignored.  That is, relative to the Hare quota, ballots for the elected candidates with second-place preferences get the influence that would have gone to these ignored ballots.

In a list PR, multi-winner election, the Hare quota is kinder to small parties than the Droop quota because they have a slightly better chance to win the final seat. (With the Droop quota, the votes that would have boosted minority representation are instead ignored.) The principle of proportional representation slightly favours the Hare quota 
In an STV multi-winner election under the Hare quota it is possible for a party supported by a clear majority of voters to receive only a minority of seats if the votes are not dispersed relatively evenly across all the party's candidates; in a list PR election under the Hare quota, a party with majority of voters can win a minority of seats depending on the distribution of votes between other parties. The principle of majority rule favours the Droop quota;
In an STV election in which there is only one seat to be filled (in other words an instant-runoff voting election) both quotas will achieve the same result, because a candidate who achieves strictly more than 50% of the votes (Droop quota) will necessarily achieve 100% (Hare quota) if the counting process is allowed to continue.

The Droop quota is today the most popular quota for STV elections.

Comparison with Hagenbach–Bischoff quota
The Droop quota does not absolutely guarantee that a party with the support of a solid majority of voters will not receive a minority of seats in a largest remainder party-list election. The only quota under which this cannot happen, even in rare cases, is the slightly smaller Hagenbach-Bischoff quota, the formula for which is identical to the Droop quota's except that the quotient is not increased to the next whole number. Another difference between the Droop and Hagenbach–Bischoff quotas is that under the Droop quota it is mathematically impossible for more candidates to reach the quota in an STV election than there are seats to be filled, although ties are still possible. This can occur under Hagenbach–Bischoff but when it does it is treated as a kind of tie, with one candidate chosen at random for exclusion. (Tie-breaking can also be resolved by reference to first preferences.)  A compromise that avoids some of the negative effects can be to use the Hagenbach-Bischoff quota increased by a very small fraction but not enough to reach the Droop quota.

See also
 List of democracy and elections-related topics

References

Further reading

 Reprinted in Voting matters Issue 24 (October 2007) pp. 7–46.

Single transferable vote
Electoral system quotas